Preemptive Strike is the first compilation album by American hip hop producer DJ Shadow, released by Mo' Wax on January  27, 1998. It contains DJ Shadow's singles released by Mo' Wax between 1993 and 1997. It peaked at number 118 on the Billboard 200 chart.

According to Shadow, "The title was in reference to what I felt was a general lack of care for my music on the US label side, and my aim was to compile the earlier Mo' Wax output in a manner of my choosing rather than it happening surreptitiously."

Critical reception

Ryan Schreiber of Pitchfork wrote, "These 11 tracks document Shadow's evolution from just a kid with a turntable to a full-blown, steady-rockin' brother with soul." Soren Baker of Chicago Tribune commented that "Sound bytes from old records and instructional tapes make brief appearances, but his spacey sound beds yield far more than just a group of cleverly arranged tape splices." Stephen Thomas Erlewine of AllMusic called it "a nice summation of DJ Shadow's most important singles through the end of 1997."

Track listing

Notes
 "Strike 1", "Strike 2", and "Strike 3 (and I'm Out)" are not included on the vinyl edition.

Personnel
Credits adapted from liner notes.
 DJ Shadow – production

Charts

References

External links
 
 

1998 compilation albums
DJ Shadow albums
Mo' Wax compilation albums
Albums produced by DJ Shadow